Edward D. Dart, FAIA (May 28, 1922 – July 9, 1975), born Edouard Dupaquier Dart and known as Ned by those close to him, was a Mid-Century modern American architect.

Early life
Dart was born in New Orleans to parents of French descent. Dart attended the Isidore Newman School in New Orleans and the Woodberry Forest School on Virginia. After two years at the University of Virginia, he would enlist in the marines. His pilot training would begin in June 1942. Dart flew bombers in the pacific during WW II. After the military he enrolled at Yale. He studied under the tutelage of Richard M. Bennett at Yale School of Architecture, whence he graduated in 1949. At Yale Dart also studied under Pietro Belluschi, Marcel Breuer, Richard Neutra, Louis Kahn, Eero Saarinen, Harold Spitznagel, and Paul Schweikher.

Career

One of Chicago's most distinguished architects, Dart was made a Fellow of the American Institute of Architects at age 44 and garnered 18 AIA awards. He developed his personal design style of using natural materials, incorporating a building into its site and free- flowing spaces while at Yale.

Death and legacy
In 1975, Dart died suddenly of an aneurysm while completing a significant commercial development. Water Tower Place. The archives of the Ryerson & Burnham Libraries, located at the Art Institute of Chicago, house a permanent collection of his works, donated in 1999 by his sister Susan.

Personal life
On January 19, 1946, Dart married the former Wilhelmina Plansoen, a Duke University alumna.

Dart died on July 9, 1975. At the time of his death, he was a resident of Barrington Hills, Illinois.

Work 

From 1965, Dart was a partner in the Chicago firm of Loebl Schlossman Bennett & Dart.  Between 1949 and 1968 he designed 52 custom houses, 26 custom churches and many commercial structures. His notable buildings include:

 St. Augustine's Episcopal Church, Gary, Indiana, 1958
 St. Procopius Abbey and Monastery, Lisle, Illinois, 1967
 Norris University Center at Northwestern University, 1971
 Pick-Staiger Concert Hall at Northwestern University, 1975
 Water Tower Place on Chicago's Magnificent Mile, 1975

Lost works
John McCutcheon House, Lake Forest, Illinois, built 1958, demolished 1992.
Lions Memorial Park Pool House, Mount Prospect, Illinois, built 1956, demolished 1980s.
Robert Hunker House, Barrington, Illinois, built 1954, demolished 1980s.
Henry P. Dart, Jr. family residence, Thetford, Vermont, built 1949, demolished 2005.
Erskine Wilder family residence, Barrington, Illinois, built 1959. Demolished 1992.
Emmanuel Presbyterian Church Chicago, Illinois, built 1963, demolished 2007.
Midway Studios Gallery, University of Chicago, built 1972, demolished 2009.
116 East Elm; Wheaton, Illinois, built 1953, demolished 2013.
Jel Sert Company, Bellwood, Illinois built 1961, demolished 2013.
1021 Lake Cook Road, Highland Park, IL, demolished 2016.
 Crown House, 350 Sunrise Circle, Glencoe, IL, built 1965, demolished 2019.

Gallery

References

Yale School of Architecture alumni
People from Barrington Hills, Illinois
Architects from New Orleans
Fellows of the American Institute of Architects
1922 births
1975 deaths
Architects from Illinois
Modernist architects
20th-century American architects
Modernist architects from the United States
American residential architects
20th-century American Episcopalians